John the Merciful, also known as St John the Almsgiver, John the Almoner, John V of Alexandria, John Eleymon, and Johannes Eleemon, was the Chalcedonian Patriarch of Alexandria in the early 7th century (from 606 to 616) and a Christian saint. He is the patron saint of Casarano, Italy and of Limassol, Cyprus.

Early life 
He was born at Amathus as the son of Epiphanius, governor of Cyprus, and was of noble descent. In early life he was married and had children, but his wife and children soon died, after which he entered religious life.

Patriarch of Alexandria 

On the death of the Patriarch Theodore, the Alexandrians besought Emperor Phocas to appoint John his successor, which was accordingly done. One of the first steps he took was to make a list of several thousand needy persons, whom he took under his especial care. He always referred to the poor as his "lords and masters", because of their mighty influence at the Court of the Most High. He assisted people of every class who were in need. 

He was a reformer who attacked simony, and fought heresy by means of improvements in religious education. He also reorganized the system of weights and measures for the sake of the poor, and put a stop to corruption among the officials. He increased the number of churches in Alexandria from seven to seventy.

The ministry of Vitalis of Gaza, a monk who worked among the prostitutes of the city, was a noteworthy episode of John's reign. The patriarch was considered to have behaved with wisdom for not punishing this monk who was notorious for visiting the seedy part of town, and his judgment was vindicated only after the death of Vitalis when the story of the monk's mission of mercy became known.

Anecdotes about almsgiving 
In his youth John had had a vision of a beautiful maiden with a garland of olives on her head, who said that she was Compassion, the eldest daughter of the Great King. This had evidently made a deep impression on John's mind, and, now that he had the opportunity of exercising benevolence on a large scale, he soon became widely known all over the East for his liberality towards the poor.

A shipwrecked merchant was thus helped three times, on the first two occasions apparently without doing him much good; the third time however, John fitted him out with a ship and a cargo of wheat, and by favourable winds he was taken as far as Britain, where, as there was a shortage of wheat, he obtained his own price. 

Another person, who was not really in need, applied for alms and was detected by the officers of the palace; but John merely said "Give unto him; he may be Our Lord in disguise." He visited the hospitals three times every week, and he freed a great many slaves. John is said to have devoted the entire revenues of his see to the alleviation of those in need. A rich man presented him with a magnificent bed covering; he accepted it for one night, but then sold it, and disposed of the money in alms. The rich man "bought in" the article, and again presented it to John, with the same result. This was repeated several times; but John drily remarked: "We will see who tires first." 

Another instance of his piety was that he caused his own grave to be dug, but only partly so, and appointed a servant to come before him on all state occasions and say "My Lord, your tomb is unfinished; pray give orders for its completion, for you know not the hour when death may seize you." When the Sassanids sacked Jerusalem in 614, John sent large supplies of food, wine, and money to the fleeing Christians. But eventually the Persians occupied Alexandria, and John himself in his old age was forced to flee to his native country, where he died.

Death and Veneration
John died in Cyprus somewhere between 616 and 620.

From Cyprus his body was moved to Constantinople, then in 1249 to Venice, where there is a church dedicated to him, the Chiesa di San Giovanni Elemosinario, although his relics are preserved in another church, San Giovanni in Bragora, in a separate chapel.

Another relic of him was sent by Sultan Bayezid II in 1489 to King Matthias Corvinus of Hungary. It was placed in the private Royal Chapel in Buda Castle, which was dedicated to him. Now his body lies in the St. John the Merciful Chapel in St. Martin's Cathedral in Bratislava, Slovakia. 

A church in Cospicua, Malta, is dedicated to him, and one of the bastions of the Santa Margherita Lines in the same city is also named after him.

Biography 
A biography was written by his contemporary Leontios of Neapolis.

See also 

 John the New Merciful

References 
General

Specific

External links

St John the Merciful of Alexandria Orthodox Icon and Synaxarion (November 12)
https://web.archive.org/web/20061019105249/http://www.catholic-forum.com/saints/saintj68.htm

610s deaths
7th-century Christian saints
Cypriot Roman Catholic saints
Egyptian Roman Catholic saints
Year of birth unknown
7th-century Patriarchs of Alexandria
Burials at St. Martin's Cathedral, Bratislava
Almoners
Heraclius